Lassi Tuovi (born 31 December 1986) is a Finnish professional basketball coach. Currently he is the head coach of the senior men's Finland national team.

References

1986 births
Living people
Basketbol Süper Ligi head coaches
Beşiktaş basketball coaches
Finnish basketball coaches
People from Lappeenranta
Sportspeople from South Karelia